Calvin Belgrave (born 2 November 1970) is a Guyanese cricketer. He played in seven first-class and nine List A matches for Guyana from 1989 to 1994.

See also
 List of Guyanese representative cricketers

References

External links
 

1970 births
Living people
Guyanese cricketers
Guyana cricketers